1959 in sports describes the year's events in world sport.

American football
 NFL Championship: the Baltimore Colts won 31–16 over the New York Giants at Baltimore's Memorial Stadium
 August 14 – The American Football League is founded.  Play would begin the following year.
 Sugar Bowl (1958 season):
 The Louisiana State Tigers won 7–0 over the Clemson Tigers to win the AP and Coaches Poll national championships

Association football
Brazil
 Taca Brasil, as predecessor for Campeonato Brasileiro Serie A, that first officially games held on August 23.
Turkey
 Turkish National League, as predecessor for Super Lig of Turkey, that first officially game held on February 21.

Athletics
 Pan American Games athletics held in Chicago with US sprinter Ray Norton winning three gold medals in the sprint events

Baseball
 March 3 –  The San Francisco Giants officially name their new stadium Candlestick Park.
 May 26 – In what many experts call the greatest pitching performance in history, Harvey Haddix—suffering with a flu and sore throat—hurls a 12 inning perfect game for the Pittsburgh Pirates but loses in the 13th inning 0–1 on a Don Hoak fielding error to the Milwaukee Braves as lightning storms threaten the end of the game.
 June 25 - Emperor Hirohito, watched Japanese professional baseball game for first time in Korakuen Baseball Stadium, Tokyo, Japan. At final resulting to Tokyo Giants win over Hanshin Tigers 5 to 4 in a home run by Shigeo Nagashima from Minoru Murayama.
 World Series – Los Angeles Dodgers win 4 games to 2 over the Chicago White Sox. The Series MVP is  Larry Sherry, Los Angeles
 The Havana Sugar Kings defeat the Richmond Virginians to win the International League Governors' Cup.
 The Minneapolis Millers win the American Association championship.
 Havana wins 4 games to 3 over Minneapolis to win the Junior World Series.
 The Salt Lake City Bees win the Pacific Coast League pennant.
 The Winnipeg Goldeyes win the Northern League championship.

Basketball
 FIBA World Championship
 Brazil World Champion
 NCAA Men's Basketball Championship –
 California wins 71–70 over West Virginia
 NBA Finals –
 Boston Celtics win 4 games to 0 over the Minneapolis Lakers

Boxing
 June 26 – in New York City, Ingemar Johansson scored a 3rd-round TKO over Floyd Patterson to win the World Heavyweight Championship
 August 27 to September 7 – Pan American Games held in Chicago, United States

Bowling
Nine-pin bowling
 Nine-pin bowling World Championships –
 Men's champion: Eberhard Luther, East Germany
 Women's champion: Hilde Beljan, East Germany
 Men's team champion: Yugoslavia
 Women's team champion: East Germany

Canadian football
 Grey Cup – Winnipeg Blue Bombers win 21–7 over the Hamilton Tiger-Cats

Cricket
 During a Currie Cup match against Natal at the Jan Smuts Ground in East London in December, Border set the record (which still stands) for the lowest aggregate score by a first class side in a match. Border scored 34 runs in the match – 16 in the first innings and 18 in the second innings.

Curling
 Inaugural World Curling Championships held in Falkirk and Edinburgh for men only and known as the "Scotch Cup"; it is won by a Canadianteam from Regina, Saskatchewan, skipped by Ernie Richardson

Figure skating
 World Figure Skating Championship –
 Men's champion: David Jenkins, United States
 Ladies' champion: Carol Heiss, United States
 Pair skating champion: Barbara Wagner & Robert Paul, Canada
 Ice dancing champion: Doreen Denny & Courtney Jones, Great Britain

Golf
Men's professional
 Masters Tournament – Art Wall, Jr.
 U.S. Open – Billy Casper
 British Open – Gary Player
 PGA Championship – Bob Rosburg
 PGA Tour money leader – Art Wall, Jr. – $53,168
 Ryder Cup – United States 8½ to 3½ over Britain in team golf
Men's amateur
 British Amateur – Deane Beman
 U.S. Amateur – Jack Nicklaus
Women's professional
 Women's Western Open – Betsy Rawls
 LPGA Championship – Betsy Rawls
 U.S. Women's Open – Mickey Wright
 Titleholders Championship – Louise Suggs
 LPGA Tour money leader – Betsy Rawls – $26,774

Horse racing
Steeplechases
 Cheltenham Gold Cup – Roddy Owen
 Grand National – Oxo
Flat races
 Australia – Melbourne Cup won by Macdougal
 Canadian Triple Crown races:
 Queen's Plate – New Providence
 Prince of Wales Stakes – New Providence
 Breeders' Stakes – New Providence
 New Providence becomes the first horse ever to win all three races.
 France – Prix de l'Arc de Triomphe won by Saint Crespin
 Ireland – Irish Derby Stakes won by Fidalgo
 English Triple Crown races:
 2,000 Guineas Stakes – Taboun
 The Derby – Parthia
 St. Leger Stakes – Cantelo
 United States Triple Crown races:
 Kentucky Derby – Tomy Lee
 Preakness Stakes – Royal Orbit
 Belmont Stakes – Sword Dancer

Ice hockey
 Art Ross Trophy as the NHL's leading scorer during the regular season: Dickie Moore, Montreal Canadiens
 Hart Memorial Trophy for the NHL's Most Valuable Player: Andy Bathgate, New York Rangers
 Stanley Cup – Montreal Canadiens win 4 games to 1 over the Toronto Maple Leafs
 World Hockey Championship
 Men's champion: Belleville McFarlands from Canada
 NCAA Men's Ice Hockey Championship – University of North Dakota Fighting Sioux defeat Michigan State University Spartans 4–3 in overtime in Troy, New York
 The Hershey Bears defeat the Buffalo Bisons 4 games to 2 to win the AHL Calder Cup.
 The Louisville Rebels defeat the Fort Wayne Komets 4 games to 2 to win the IHL Turner Cup.
 On November 1, Montreal Canadiens goaltender Jacques Plante was injured when struck in the face by a flying puck.  He offers to return to play on the condition that he wears his goalie mask.  His example soon leads to the mask becoming standard equipment for goalies and a symbol of the game itself.
 The TV-pucken tournament starts.

Motorsport

Rugby league
1959 New Zealand rugby league season
1958–59 Northern Rugby Football League season/1959–60 Northern Rugby Football League season
1959 NSWRFL season

Rugby union
 65th Five Nations Championship series is won by France, the team's first outright championship title

Swimming
 July 11 – US swimmer Michael Troy breaks his own first official world record (2:19.0), set earlier in the day, in the men's 200m butterfly (long course) at a meet in Los Altos, California, clocking 2:16.4.
 July 19 – US swimmer Becky Collins breaks the world record in the women's 200m butterfly at a meet in Redding, California, clocking 2:37.0.

Tennis
Australia
 Australian Men's Singles Championship – Alex Olmedo (USA) defeats Neale Fraser (Australia) 6–1, 6–2, 3–6, 6–3
 Australian Women's Singles Championship – Mary Carter Reitano (Australia) defeats Renee Schuurman Haygarth (South Africa) 6–2, 6–3
England
 Wimbledon Men's Singles Championship – Alex Olmedo (USA) defeats Rod Laver (Australia) 6–4, 6–3, 6–4
 Wimbledon Women's Singles Championship – Maria Bueno (Brazil) defeats Darlene Hard (USA) 6–4, 6–3
France
 French Men's Singles Championship – Nicola Pietrangeli (Italy) defeats Ian Vermaak (South Africa) 3–6, 6–3, 6–4, 6–1
 French Women's Singles Championship – Christine Truman (Great Britain) defeats Zsuzsa Körmöczy (Hungary) 6–4, 7–5
USA
 American Men's Singles Championship – Neale Fraser (Australia) defeats Alex Olmedo (USA) 6–3, 5–7, 6–2, 6–4
 American Women's Singles Championship – Maria Bueno (Brazil) defeats Christine Truman (Great Britain) 6–1, 6–4
Davis Cup
 1959 Davis Cup –  3–2  at West Side Tennis Club (grass) New York City, United States

Volleyball
 Volleyball at the 1959 Pan American Games in Chicago won by USA (men) and Brazil (women)

Multi-sport events
 Central American and Caribbean Games held in Caracas, Venezuela
 Third Pan American Games held in Chicago, United States
 Third Mediterranean Games held in Beirut, Lebanon
 First Summer Universiade held in Turin, Italy

Awards
 Associated Press Male Athlete of the Year – Ingemar Johansson, Boxing
 Associated Press Female Athlete of the Year – Maria Bueno, Tennis

References

 
Sports by year